Leela may refer to:

Business 
 The Leela Group, an Indian business conglomerate
 The Leela Palaces, Hotels and Resorts, an Indian luxury hotel group

Characters
 Leela, granddaughter of Akela in Rudyard Kipling's The Jungle Book
Leela (Doctor Who), a fictional character in the British science fiction series Doctor Who
 Leela (Futurama), a fictional character in the animated television series Futurama
 Leela Lomax, a fictional character in the British soap opera Hollyoaks
 Leela, a human character on Sesame Street

Film
 Leela (2002 film), a drama directed by Somnath Sen
 Leela (2016 film), an Indian Malayalam-language film directed by Ranjith
 Ek Paheli Leela (Leela: A Mystery), a 2015 Indian thriller film

Other uses 
 Leela (name)
 Leela (game), a board game with origins in ancient India
 Leela (software), computer Go software
 Leela Chess Zero, an open-source chess-playing program
 Lila (Hinduism), an alternate transliteration for the Hindu cosmological concept
 Leela Attitude, an attitude of walking Buddha in Thai art

See also 
 Layla (disambiguation)
 Leila (disambiguation)
 Lelia (disambiguation)
 Lila (disambiguation)